Scaithin was an early Medieval Irish saint.

Biography
Scaithin was the builder of an oratory on Inishbofin, Galway, used into the 20th century as a children's burial ground. His feast day is 2 January. Scoithín is a variant form of the name, and is that of a saint with links to County Kilkenny, where his seven sons became bishops.

See also
 Mathias of Inis Ní
 Enda of Aran
 Alonzo Bosco

References
 Inisbofin:Guide to the Natural History & Archaeology, Dave Hogan and Michael Gibbons.
 A Guide to Connemara's Early Christian Sites, Anthony Previté, Oughterard, 2008.

External links
 http://www.inishbofin.com/Earlychristian.html

People from County Galway
Medieval Irish saints